Frank Rice (January 15, 1845 – December 5, 1914) was an American lawyer and politician.

Life
He was born on January 15, 1845, in Seneca, Ontario County, New York. He attended Dr. Taylor's private school at Geneva, New York, Geneva Classical and Union School, and Canandaigua Academy. He graduated from Hamilton College in 1868. The following year he began studying law at the firm of Comstock and Bennett in Canandaigua, New York, was admitted to the bar and became a clerk in the surrogate's office in 1870.

He was District Attorney of Ontario County from 1875 to 1881. He was a member of the New York State Assembly (Ontario Co.) in 1883 and 1884; and was Chairman of the Committee on Privileges and Elections in 1883, and Minority Leader in 1884. From 1885 to 1889, he was Judge of the Ontario County Court. He was Secretary of State of New York from 1890 to 1893, elected at the New York state election, 1889 and the New York state election, 1891. He was a delegate to the 1880, 1892 and 1912 Democratic National Conventions.

He died on December 5, 1914, in Canandaigua, New York.

Sources
 Prognosis of election result mentioning earlier defeat of Raines by Rice, in NYT on October 27, 1895
 Bios from History of Ontario County (Conover & Aldrich, 1893, p. 155f), and  History of Ontario Co., NY & Its People (1911, Vol. II, p. 332), at usgennet
 Sketches of the Democratic candidates, in NYT on October 2, 1889
 Obit in NYT on December 6, 1914

1845 births
1914 deaths
Members of the New York State Assembly
Secretaries of State of New York (state)
County district attorneys in New York (state)
Hamilton College (New York) alumni
Politicians from Canandaigua, New York
People from Seneca, New York
New York (state) state court judges
19th-century American judges